The 1987 FIA European Formula Three Cup was the third European Formula Three Cup race and the first to be held at the Silverstone Circuit on October 4, 1987. The race was won by Briton Steve Kempton, driving for Reynard R&D outfit, who finished ahead of Italian Alberto Apicella and Belgian Bertrand Gachot.

Drivers and teams

Classification

Qualifying

Race

See also
FIA European Formula Three Cup

References

FIA European Formula Three Cup
FIA European Formula Three Cup